St. George Academy, also known as St. George's Ukrainian Catholic School, is an American private, Ukrainian-Catholic high school, located in the East Village neighborhood of the Manhattan borough of New York City.

It is located within the Roman Catholic Archdiocese of New York. It is co-located with La Salle Academy.

Background
The school was founded in 1947 by the Fathers of the Order of Saint Basil the Great.

The school was historically heavily Ukrainian American, with 900 being the peak enrollment of students of Ukrainian origin.

In 2022 its enrollment was 80, with 37% of that figure being of Ukrainian ancestry. The school community became concerned after the 2022 invasion of Ukraine due to its ties to Ukraine. By March 2022, three refugees from the war became students at St. George Academy.

References

Further reading

External links

 , the school's website

1940 establishments in New York City
East Village, Manhattan
Educational institutions established in 1940
Private high schools in Manhattan
Roman Catholic secondary schools in New York City
Ukrainian-American culture in New York City